Marc Sylvan is an English composer and sound designer.

Television credits include The Masked Singer, The Million Pound Drop, Pointless, Total Wipeout, Tipping Point, All Together Now, Cannonball, Family Fortunes, Alesha's Street Dance Stars, The Bank Job, Golden Balls, 101 Ways to Leave a Gameshow, Divided and Richard Osman's House of Games.

His work on the sci-fi short ‘Embryo’ won ‘Best Sound Design’ at Vision Festival in 2005, which led to collaborations with Beavis & Butthead animator James Dean Conklin and Shrek animator Lee Lanier.

Marc has often worked with award-winning video game composer Richard Jacques on game releases including Sonic & Sega All-Stars Racing, The Club and Virtua Tennis. Other collaborations include working with former The Rakes guitarist Matthew Swinnerton under the name 'Buro'.

Marc is published by Faber Music and is also a director and on the media executive of The Ivors Academy.

External links
 

English composers
Living people
Place of birth missing (living people)
Year of birth missing (living people)
British sound designers